Al-Ḥārith ibn ʿAbd al-Muṭṭalib was one of the uncles of Muhammad. He was the son of Abd al-Muttalib, of the Quraysh in Mecca, by his first wife, Sumra bint Jundab, who was from Hawazin tribe. For a long time his father, who took from him the kunya Abu al-Harith, had no other children.

It is said that al-Harith assisted Abd al-Muttalib with the excavation of the Zamzam Well by carrying away the dug earth. Al-Harith had many children by some wives.

Family 
By Ghaziyya bint Qays from Banu ib (al-Harith) ibn Fihr, he had five children:

Nawfal was his eldest son. He became a Muslim after being captured at the Battle of Badr and died in 635. He married Zariba bint Sa'id ibn Qashib from Banu Azd and had many children.
Rabī‘ah was born c.566 and converted to Islam during the Battle of the Trench. He married Umm al-Hakam bint al-Zubayr, his paternal cousin, and had many children. He outlived all his brothers but had died by 644.
Abū Sufyān (Mughīrah). He became a Muslim during the Conquest of Mecca and died in 636.
Abd Allah, became a Muslim before 630. He died in Muhammad's lifetime, in 624. His children lived after him in Syria.
Arwā, she married Abu Wida'a ibn Sabara. and had many children. She died in 636.

By Sukhayla bint Khuza'i from Banu Thaqif, he had children:

 Ubayda, married Sa'da bint Kurayz (his cousin) and had many children. He died in 624.
 Tufayl, was born in 583. He died in 653. He married Atika (Barra) bint Kurayz (his cousin) and had children named Fatima, Abd Allah and Amir.
 Husayn, died in 653. He married Umm Abd Allah (Arwa) bint Adi ibn Khuwaylid from Banu Asad ibn Abd al-Uzza. By her, he had children named Abd Allah, Khadija, and Hind.
Qays, married Umm Sufyan (Hamina/Habiba) bint Abi Talha from Banu Abd al-Dar. By her, he had children named Sufyan, Abd Allah, and Zaynab.
Abd al-Muttalib
Murrah.

By Safiyya bint al-Aswad ibn al-Muttalib, from Banu Asad ibn Abd-al-Uzza. By her, he had children:

 Buhayna, married Malik ibn al-Qashib and had sons named Jubayr and Abd Allah.
 Ubda, married Malik ibn Jundab and had daughters named Zaynab, Jamila, and Fatima.
 Umayya.
 Awf.
 Abd Shams.

Al-Harith outlived his brother Abdullah, who died in late 570 or early 571, but he died before his father, who died in 579.

Abd al-Muttalib said, that Ghaziyya bint Qays (ibn Tareef/Turayf ibn Abd-al-Uzza ibn Amir ibn Umayra ibn Wadi'a bin al-Harith ibn Fihr) was the eldest wife of his first son.

Family tree 

 * indicates that the marriage order is disputed
 Note that direct lineage is marked in bold.

See also 
Companions of the Prophet
Abd al-Muttalib (name)
Safiyya bint Abd al-Muttalib

References

External links 
https://web.archive.org/web/20051210215334/http://web.umr.edu/~msaumr/reference/companions/English/sufyan.html

Companions of the Prophet
Family of Muhammad
Banu Hashim